Victor Forget (October 6, 1916 – March 9, 1986) was a Liberal party member of the House of Commons of Canada. He was a medical representative by career.

He was elected at the Saint-Michel riding in
the 1968 general election and served only one term in the 28th Canadian Parliament. Forget left federal office and did not participate in any further elections.

External links
 

1916 births
1986 deaths
Members of the House of Commons of Canada from Quebec
Liberal Party of Canada MPs